Srđan Flajs (born 12 July 1975) is a Serbian basketball coach.

Coaching career 
Flajs had started his coaching career with Beovuk 72 where he coached youth system, as well as the senior team. In 2003, he joined the Atlas coaching stuff. During 2006–07 season he was an assistant coach for Vojvodina Srbijagas.

Flajs was a head coach for Superfund for two seasons. In his second season he managed to won the Serbian B League championship. Later, he was a part of a coaching stuff for Crvena zvezda, Lietuvos rytas (Lithuania) and Mega Leks.

In June 2017, Flajs joined Budućnost VOLI coaching staff after Serbian coach Aleksandar Džikić become their head coach for the 2017–18 season. In January 2021, he was named an assistant coach of Budućnost under Dejan Milojević.

In July 2022, Flajs joined Hapoel Jerusalem coaching staff, once again as an assistant coach under Džikić, but in September reached an agreement with the team for terminating his contract due to personal reasons.

National team career 
Flajs coached Libya national under-19 basketball team for the 2007–08 season. Also, he was an assistant coach of the Serbia men's national under-20 basketball team for two years, in 2011 and 2012.

Career achievements and awards 
Head coach
 Serbian B League champion: 1 (with Superfund: 2009–10)
Assistant coach
 Adriatic League champion: 1 (with Budućnost VOLI: 2017–18)
 Montenegrin League champion: 1 (with Budućnost VOLI: 2020–21)
 Montenegrin Cup winner: 2 (with Budućnost VOLI: 2017–18, 2020–21)
 Serbian Cup winner: 1 (with Mega Leks: 2015–16)

References

External links
 Coach Profile at eurobasket.com

1975 births
Living people
KK Beovuk 72 coaches
KK Beopetrol/Atlas Beograd coaches
KK Crvena zvezda assistant coaches
KK Superfund coaches
Serbian men's basketball coaches
Serbian expatriate basketball people in Israel
Serbian expatriate basketball people in Libya
Serbian expatriate basketball people in Lithuania
Serbian expatriate basketball people in Montenegro
Sportspeople from Belgrade